Norfolk—Elgin was a federal electoral district represented in the House of Commons of Canada from 1925 to 1935. It was located in the province of Ontario. This riding was created in 1924 from Norfolk riding and parts of Elgin East riding.

It consisted of the county of Norfolk and the townships of Bayham and Malahide in the county of Elgin.

The electoral district was abolished in 1933 when it was redistributed between Norfolk and Elgin ridings.

Electoral history

|- 
  
|Conservative
|STANSELL, John Lawrence   
|align="right"| 8,145    

|}

|- 
  
|Liberal
|TAYLOR, William Horace   
|align="right"| 8,568   
  
|Conservative
|STANSELL, John Lawrence   
|align="right"| 8,512    
|}

|- 
  
|Liberal
|TAYLOR, William H.   
|align="right"|9,424   
  
|Conservative
|STANSELL, John Lawrence   
|align="right"|  9,419    
|}

See also 

 List of Canadian federal electoral districts
 Historical federal electoral districts of Canada

External links 

 Website of the Parliament of Canada

Former federal electoral districts of Ontario
Norfolk County, Ontario